Christian Alexander Holm-Glad   (born 24 December 1976) is a Norwegian film director.

Christian Holm-Glad has directed and produced numerous music videos, tv-series and documentaries. He has worked with artists including Kygo, Calvin Harris, Madcon, Kano, Serena Maneesh, Kaada, Number Seven Deli, Cloroform, Thirstin Howl III, Launderettes and more and has had number one hits in the UK and in Norway. After their collaboration, Calvin Harris stated: "He is amazing and all music videos should be directed by him!". He has also directed several TV series for Scandinavian TV in addition to numerous commercials and short films. He has been nominated seven times and has received one Norwegian Emmy Award "Gullruten", and clips from his series have been seen over 30 million times on YouTube. He is a veteran of international film festivals, receiving nominations and awards from festivals across the globe. Christian Holm-Glad is the founder of the Norwegian production company Bulldozer Film and the Norwegian art and science edutainment company Science Addiction. Christian Holm-Glad has been signed as a director at the Scandinavian production company Bacon, the French production company Excuse My French and the American production company REVERIE Content.

Long format

Short format

Theatre

Awards and nominations

References

External links 
 
Bulldozer Film
Bacon Copenhagen

1976 births
Film people from Oslo
Norwegian film directors
Norwegian music video directors
Norwegian television directors
Living people